Space Mowgli, also known as The Kid, is a 1971 science fiction novel by Russian writers Boris and Arkady Strugatsky, set in the Noon Universe.

Plot summary 

The novel describes the "Ark Project" of 2160 and the first (and last) contact with Ark Megaforms. The story is told by Stanislav Popov, a technician of the ER-2 team, one of the twelve ecologist teams that were working on Ark to prepare the planet for the arrival of the colonists from Pant. The ER-2 consists of Popov, Gennady Komov, Maya Glumova and Yakov Vanderhuze.

The story begins as the members of ER-2 go on a routine exploration mission while Popov is left behind to oversee the construction of a permanent base for the arriving colonists. Suddenly, the construction robots get out of control and leave the construction site. It takes a few hours for Popov to locate the robots, fix them and set them back to work.

After that, Popov hears a human baby crying. Popov tries to locate the source of the sound but the crying stops as suddenly as it started. Since infants are not allowed to leave Earth, Popov assumes he had an auditory hallucination. Popov carries on his work with the robots. Now, he hears a female voice pleading for help from somebody named Shura. Popov cannot locate the source of the voice either.

Meanwhile, the ER-2 exploration party discovers the wreckage of an Earth spaceship and the remains of its two pilots. They log a report describing their discovery with the 
orbital base. The following night, the ER-2 members start to exhibit the symptoms of psychosis. Popov is the most heavily affected. However, he does not tell the others about his condition: if he is found to be unfit for duty he might be recalled to Earth.

As the team has breakfast the following morning, a figure of a 13-year-old human boy appears on the base. Popov ignores it assuming that it is another one of his hallucinations. However, the other people see the boy too. They try to follow him but the boy quickly leaves the premises and the explorers lose his track. The team sends a report back to the orbital base. They receive a reply from Leonid Gorbovsky. The mission of ER-2 is changed to establish contact with a possible alien race.

Another message arrives that identifies the spaceship that ER-2 discovered as Pilgrim and the two pilots as Alexander (Russian short for this name is Shura) Semyonov and his wife Maria-Luisa Semyonova. They had their newborn child Piere Semyonov on board. The spaceship disappeared in 2147.  This leads ER-2 members to assume that the boy they saw in the morning is Piere Semyonov.

The leader of the team - Komov leaves the ship to scout the surroundings of the base. However, Piere Semyonov soon comes to the base himself. Apparently, he tries to communicate with the humans, they do not understand him and he leaves again. The behavior of the Kid (the official nickname given to Piere, hence the Russian title of the novel) is rather strange. This leads the humans to assume that he was raised by the local alien race.

Giant, segmented, insect-like, antennae rise over a distant mountain range. There is no direct connection between the antennae and the aliens, but the newly discovered race is named Ark Megaforms. The demonstration of the antennae appears to be an act of intimidation. It soon becomes apparent that Ark Megaforms want the humans to leave the planet as soon as possible. The Megaforms use the Kid as their negotiator with the humans. The Kid visits the base of ER-2 several times. He allows the humans to study him and question him about his foster parents in exchange for the promise to leave. The communication does not proceed smoothly as the Kid exhibits the mixture of human and alien psychological traits. His very way of thought seems inconceivable to humans. Though he can speak, most of the questions he is either unable or unwilling to answer. Moreover, there is a conflict of interest as the humans want to find out about Ark Megaforms as much as possible while the Kid just wants them to leave.

Frustrated with the lack of progress the humans give the Kid a portable video transmitter. They do not tell the Kid its function and hope that he will take it with him and the scientists will be able to track his movements outside the base. Over the transmitter the humans see as the Kid walks to the wreckage of the Pilgrim, levitates to a distant canyon and proceeds into the planet's interior. At this moment one of the humans - Maya Glumova turns on an emergency flashlight that is built into the transmitter. The transmission immediately stops. It is disputed if Maya did it on purpose. However, Komov takes the responsibility for the failure of the mission on himself.

Gorbovsky contacts Komov and tells him that most likely humans will not be able to establish a contact with Ark Megaforms because they are a closed civilization that avoids contacts with others. Gorbovsky informs Komov that an ancient satellite was discovered orbiting Ark. The satellite was built by the Wanderers and was programmed to destroy any approaching spaceship. Apparently, this satellite shot down the Pilgrim 13 years ago. Humans conclude that the Wanderers wanted to prevent anyone from contacting Ark Megaforms.

In the epilogue of the novel, Popov talks to the Kid over the video transmitter and reflects on the decisions made by the humans. The humans decided to evacuate Ark and the only remaining contact is through the Kid. Komov, some of his teammates and Piere's grandfather are allowed to talk to him. However, they should carefully avoid any themes related to Ark Megaforms. In the novel there is no mention whether the Ark Project was ever concluded.

Publication history 
The Brothers Strugatsky conceived the idea for the novel in 1970. The working book title was "Operation MOWGLI", however was eventually published under the title Kid. The novel was written in 1970 and is one of a series of books set in the Noon Universe. The novel was published the year after in the journal Aurora.

The English translation was included in a single volume entitled Escape Attempt with the other Noon universe stories Escape Attempt and The Kid from Hell.

In the process of creating a 12 Volume collection of the works of the Brothers Strugatsky (Publisher Stalker, in the year 2000) Boris Strugatsky gave legal permission for the dates to be changed in the novel. As such, the dates 20th, 231st, 233rd and 234th years became 34th, 144th, 147th, 148th years.

Movie adaptations
	A partial adaptation in the third episode of the show This Fantastical World (1980).
	Kid, television movie, theatrical adaptation in the Central Children’s Theatre (1987). 
	Unplanned Meetings, Česká televize film (1995).

English releases 
 Strugatsky, Arkady and Boris. Escape Attempt (Best of Soviet Science Fiction) translated by Roger DeGaris. New York: Macmillan Pub Co, May 14, 1982, 321 pp. . LCCN: 82000029.

References

External links
 
 

1971 novels
1971 in the Soviet Union
1971 science fiction novels
Soviet science fiction novels
Noon Universe novels
Novels by Arkady and Boris Strugatsky
Fictional feral children
Russian novels adapted into television shows
Russian novels adapted into films